U.S. Route 29 (US 29) is a United States highway that runs for  from the South Carolina state line, near Blacksburg, to the commonwealth of Virginia, near Danville.  It is signed with north-south cardinal directions, but is actually a north-east and south-west diagonal highway throughout the state. The route serves the North Carolina Piedmont, including the cities of Charlotte, Salisbury, High Point, and Greensboro. From Salisbury to Greensboro, US 29 spends roughly a third of its length in the state being concurrent with US 70.

Route description
US 29 starts in Grover as a two lane rural road where it intersects with NC 226 shortly after. It then turns into a four lane boulevard as it heads to Kings Mountain briefly overlapping with NC 216 as it merges into Interstate 85 sharing a concurrency with the interstate. It then exits Interstate 85 at Exit 10A running together with US 74. US 29/74 then overlaps with NC 274 for two miles as the three routes head towards Gastonia. In downtown Gastonia, US 29/74/NC 274 intersects with US 321 with NC 274 splitting off on South Broad Street. US 29/74 then meets NC 279 before going into Lowell, McAdenville, and Belmont where US 29/74 meets NC 7 and then Interstate 485 before going to Charlotte. US 29/74 offers access to Charlotte Douglas International Airport before intersecting with Billy Graham Parkway. Here, US 29/74 is named Wilkinson Blvd. At Morehead Street, US 29 splits from US 74 where US 29 briefly overlaps with NC 27 and then intersects Interstate 77. Afterwards, US 29 splits from NC 27 where it meets NC 49 as the two routes go around the Bank of America stadium, and go along Graham Street through Uptown Charlotte. 

Afterwards, US 29/NC 49 turns into a boulevard going east on Dalton Avenue, and then north on Tryon Street. Eventually, US 29/NC 49 intersects Old Concord Road where the Lynx Blue Line runs between the northbound and southbound lanes. At University City Boluevard, NC 49 splits from US 29 with NC 49 going around the southern part of the University of North Carolina at Charlotte campus, and US 29 going around the west. Here, the Lynx Blue Line goes under the northbound lanes of US 29 to offer access to UNC Charlotte while US 29 continues as a boulevard towards Concord. Before doing so, it intersects with Interstate 485 once again. Before heading towards Concord, US 29 offers access to the Charlotte Motor Speedway before meeting at an interchange with George Liles Parkway. It then briefly overlaps with US 601 and NC 73 in western Concord before US 601 splits to run concurrently with I-85 and NC 73 splitting to head towards downtown Concord. From here, US 29 runs north through Kannapolis. US 29 then goes through Landis and China Grove briefly overlapping with NC 152 east of China Grove.

US 29 then heads towards Salisbury where, west of downtown Salisbury, it beings to run concurrently with US 70 serving as Salisbury's Main Street. After going through downtown Salisbury, US 29/70 offers access to both Spencer and East Spencer before crossing over the Yadkin River. Afterwards, US 29/70 then merges into I-85/US 52 as the four highways all run together for roughly two miles. At exit 87, US 29/52/70 splits from I-85 with and briefly joins I-285 and I-85 Business. West of Lexington, US 52 and I-285 split away from US 29/70/I-85 Business where US 29/70/I-85 Business goes around the northern edge of Lexington where the three routes briefly overlap with US 64 before heading towards Thomasville.

Exiting Thomasville, US 29/70/I-85 Business then goes south of High Point and north of Trinity and Archdale before intersecting I-74 southeast of High Point. Following this, US 29/70/I-85 Business once again runs together with I-85 proper before splitting at the interchange with I-73/US 421. US 29/70/I-85 Business then merges into I-40 running together with US 220 south of Greensboro. The now five, simultaneously running highways (US 29, US 70, US 220, I-40, and I-85 Business) go around southern Greensboro before US 29/70/220 splits from I-40/I-85 Business going north around eastern Greensboro as a controlled access highway named O'Henry Blvd. As US 29/70/220 intersects Wendover Avenue, US 70 and US 220 split from US 29 with US 70 going east along Wendover Ave, and US 220 going west. 

US 29, now all alone, goes through the northeastern suburbs of Greensboro where it intersects with I-785, and will run concurrently with I-785 past the Virginia line once modifications to the existing US 29 are completed. After meeting I-785, US 29 is largely rural with Reidsville being the last town served along the route. Here in Reidsville, US 29 intersects with US 29 Business with the latter acting as beltline stretching around western Reidsville. Afterwards, US 29 heads northeast to Virginia just southwest of Danville.

History
Established in 1927, it ran from the South Carolina state line to US 74 in Kings Mountain, with a concurrency with NC 205.  In 1929, NC 205 was removed.

US 29's first extension was in 1932, following US 74/NC 20 east into Charlotte; it then replaced US 170 from Charlotte to the Virginia state line.  In 1937, it replaced a stretch of NC 7 going between Kings Mountain and Gastonia; the old route briefly became alternates for both U.S. Routes before becoming NC 161 and NC 274.

In 1938, US 29 was moved onto a new bypass around Kannapolis-China Grove, leaving US 29A on the old route. In 1948, the routes were switched.  In 1952, US 29 was moved onto new bypasses around Lexington and Thomasville, leaving behind US 29A in both cities.  In 1957, US 29 was moved onto its modern route from Thomasville to Jamestown, old route became part of NC 62 and US 70A.

In 1957 or 1958, US 29 was moved onto new bypass west of Reidsville, leaving US 29A (later US 29 Business) through Reidsville.  Also around same time, US 29 was moved onto new bypass east of Kings Mountain, extending NC 216 over its old route; then in Charlotte, it moved onto I-85 between Little Rock Road (exit 32) and the University City area (exit 42), old route through Charlotte as US 29 Business.  In 1961 or 1962, US 29 was moved back further to NC 273 going onto I-85; but surprisingly, in 1963, US 29 was placed back on its original route through Charlotte again.  Similar action also in Salisbury, where in 1960 US 29 was moved onto I-85, then in 1964 or 1965 it was moved back through town.

In 1973, US 29 was placed on a new freeway bypass east of Reidsville; its old bypass route was reverted to US 29 Business, while the old US 29 Business through Reidsville was removed.  Between 1980-1982, the freeway from Reidsville was extended into Virginia.

U.S. Route 170

U.S. Route 170 (US 170) was an original US highway, established in 1926.  It began at the intersection of Trade and Tryon Street in Charlotte, traversing northeast, in concurrency with NC 15 to Concord, Kannapolis, and Salisbury.  Northeast of Salisbury, it was overlapped with NC 10 to Lexington, High Point, and Greensboro; via High Point Road to Lee Street, to Fairground Avenue, to Spring Garden Street, to Aycock Street, to West Market Street, to Greene Street, and finally to Summit Avenue, where it begins its overlap with NC 70 heading northwest to Browns Summit.  Heading northeast, it went through Reidsville, Ruffin, and finally Pelham before crossing into Virginia towards Danville and eventually Lynchburg.  In 1932, US 29 joined in concurrency with US 170. Later on, the US 170 designation was removed, leaving US 29 on the route.

Future

The freeway stretch of US 29 traveling southwest from Greensboro, to Lexington, North Carolina is currently also signed as Interstate 85 Business and US 70. On October 5, 2019, NCDOT submitted an application to AASHTO, and was granted approval, for the removal of the I-85 Business designation from the freeway, and the rerouting of US 70 between Greensboro and Thomasville leaving US 29 on the route. This plan, according to the state, will simplify overhead signage on the freeway, and eliminate route redundancies.

Junction list

See also
 
 
 Special routes of U.S. Route 29

References

External links

 
 NCRoads.com: U.S. 29
 NCRoads.com: U.S. 170

29
 North Carolina
Transportation in Charlotte, North Carolina
Transportation in Greensboro, North Carolina
Transportation in Cleveland County, North Carolina
Transportation in Gaston County, North Carolina
Transportation in Mecklenburg County, North Carolina
Transportation in Cabarrus County, North Carolina
Transportation in Rowan County, North Carolina
Transportation in Davidson County, North Carolina
Transportation in Randolph County, North Carolina
Transportation in Guilford County, North Carolina
Transportation in Rockingham County, North Carolina
Transportation in Caswell County, North Carolina